Rosendo is an extinct genus of notohippid notoungulates that lived during the Early Oligocene in what is now Argentina and Chile. Fossils of this genus have been found in the Sarmiento Formation and the Abanico Formations of Argentina and Chile.

Description

Rosendo was approximately the size of a goat, albeit with a more robust build. It had a heavy and sturdy skull, with a relatively short muzzle. The dentition was characterized by high-crowned (hypsodont) incisors, posterior premolars and molars. The teeth didn't have cementum. The upper incisors were slightly protruding forward. The third upper incisor was wider than the other two, while the fourth premolar was more molariform than the other premolars, but devoid of a distinct hypocone. The upper molars had hypocones, with a variable but generally deep fissure separating them from the protocones. The fissure was blocked by the medial projection of a hooked structure. Apart from the permanent major fossa, the other fossae are erased with wear.

Taxonomy

The genus Rosendo was first described in 2018 by André R. Wyss, based on fossil remains found in Patagonia, in deposits dated to the Early Oligocene. The type species is Rosendo pascuali, whose fossils have also been found in the Sarmiento Formation of Chubut Province, Argentina, as well as the Abanico Formation of Chile. Historically, the genus was originally attributed to the genus Eomorphippus in 1967, described by George Gaylord Simpson, but was subsequently found to be a distinct genus in 2018.

Rosendo is a toxodont, a clade of notoungulates, that developed a remarkable diversity of forms during the Cenozoic. Eomorphippus has been historically included within the family Notohippidae, which included several genera whose hypsodont teeth were similar to those of horses. This family, however, is no longer considered monophyletic.

The following position of the Toxodontia is based on Martínez et al. 2021, showing the position of Rosendo.

References 

Toxodonts
Prehistoric placental genera
Oligocene mammals of South America
Paleogene Argentina
Paleogene Chile
Fossils of Argentina
Fossils of Chile
Tinguirirican
Fossil taxa described in 2018
Golfo San Jorge Basin
Sarmiento Formation